Anna Svärd may refer to:

 Anna Svärd (novel), a 1928 novel by the Swedish writer Selma Lagerlöf
 Anna Le Moine (born 1973), formerly known as Anna Svärd, Swedish curler